The following is the list of Russian film directors.

A
Vadim Abdrashitov
Sarik Andreasyan
André Andrejew
Oleg Anofriyev
Semyon Aranovich
Artur Aristakisyan

B
Aleksei Balabanov
Kantemir Balagov
Boris Barnet
Yevgeni Bauer
Timur Bekmambetov
Lidia Bobrova
Sergei Bodrov
Sergei Bodrov, Jr.
Fedor Bondarchuk
Alexander Borodyansky
Vladimir Bortko
Arcady Boytler
Konstantin Bronzit
Dimitri Buchowetzki
Yuri Bykov

C
Pyotr Chardynin
Pavel Chukhray

D
Grigoriy Dobrygin
Ivan Dykhovichny

E
Sergei Eisenstein
Andrei Andreyevich Eshpai
Nurbek Egen

F
Costa Fam
Aleksey Fedorchenko
Prince Michael Feodorovich of Russia
Dmitri Alexeyevich Frolov

G
Levan Gabriadze
Vladimir Gardin
Sergei Gerasimov
Marion Gering
Aleksei Alekseivich German
Aleksei Yuryevich German
Valeriya Gai Germanika
Victor Ginzburg
Georgi Gitis
Alexander Goldstein
Vasily Goncharov
Stanislav Govorukhin
Alexis Granowsky
Yuli Gusman
Ishtar Yasin Gutierrez
Alexander Gutman

I
Ikiru
Viktor Ivanov
Aleksandr Ivanovsky

K
Roman Abelevich Kachanov
Roman Romanovich Kachanov
Mikheil Kalatozishvili
Yuri Kara
Andrey Kavun
Tigran Keosayan
Rustam Khamdamov
Nikolay Khomeriki
Vladimir Khotinenko
Aleksandr Khvan
Andrei Khrzhanovsky
Ilya Khrzhanovsky
Viktor Kossakovsky
Alexander Kott
Andrei Kravchuk
Eldar Kuliev

L
Vasily Livanov
Konstantin Lopushansky
Pavel Lungin
Alexey Lushnikov
Pavel Lyubimov

M
Alexei Makarov
Yuri Mamin
Vitaly Mansky
Vladimir Mashkov
Vladimir Maslov
Anna Melikian
Vladimir Menshov
Dmitriy Meshiev
Alexandre Michon
Nikita Mikhalkov
Nikolay Milovidov
Alexander Mitta
Léonide Moguy
Peter Mostavoy

N
Vladimir Naumov
Leonid Nechayev
Andrei Nekrasov
Alexander Nevsky
Angelina Nikonova
Sergei Nolbandov

O
Ivan Okhlobystin
Sergio Olhovich
Nikolay Olyalin
Fedor Ozep

P
Gleb Panfilov
Andrei Panin
Maksim Pezhemsky
Gennadi Poloka
Alyona Polunina
Alexei Popogrebski
Mikhail Porechenkov
Aleksandr Porokhovshchikov
Maxim Pozdorovkin
Valeriy Priyomykhov
Aleksandr Proshkin
Yakov Protazanov
Vsevolod Pudovkin

R
Gregory Ratoff
Diana Ringo
Aleksandr Rogozhkin
Pavel Ruminov
Sergei Ryabov
Oleg Ryaskov

S
Aleksei Saltykov
Samson Samsonov
Mikhail Segal
Nikolay Serebryakov
Aleksandr Seryj
Andrei Severny
Karen Shakhnazarov
Vasily Shukshin
Vassily Sigarev
Andrei Smirnov
Alexander Sokurov
Yuliya Solntseva
Stanislav Solovkin
Sergei Solovyov
Ladislas Starevich
Alexander Stefanovich
Vera Storozheva
Boris Svetlov

T
Andrei Tarkovsky
Alexander Tatarsky
Marianna Tavrog
Pyotr Todorovsky
Valery Todorovsky
Pyotr Tochilin
Boris Tokarev
Victor Trivas
George Tsisetski
Slava Tsukerman
Mikhail Tumanishvili
Nikita Gennadievich Tyagunov

U
Alexei Uchitel
Eldor Magomatovich Urazbayev
Sergei Ursuliak

V
Mikhail Vartanov
Ruslan Vitryanyuk
Alexandre Volkoff

W
Ip Wischin

Y
Filipp Yankovsky
Vlad Yudin
Yevgeny Yufit

Z
Andrej Andreevich Zolotov
Andrey Zvyagintsev

Russian
 
Film directors